Killa Season is a 2006 American crime drama film produced, written and directed by Cam’ron, who stars as a rapper whose early life as a hustler in Harlem, NY is explored. It also stars Juelz Santana, Hell Rell, and Funkmaster Flex.

Overview

Cam'ron's debut into the film world chronicles a loosely autobiographical plot of his own transformation from a high school basketball star to a full-time heroin dealer. This film is based on the life of High school basketball phenom Karlton Hines. Cameron's character is named "Flea."

The film also starred Juelz Santana as "Bandana", Hell Rell as Hell, & Funkmaster Flex as Fred.

Other members of the Diplomats who made appearances in the film included 40 Cal, Un Kasa, J. R. Writer and "Chubbie Baby," who served as Flea's supplier of firearms. However, these three members played minor roles and their parts did not involve much dialogue. Jim Jones, The Diplomats co-founder, is seen only briefly in the beginning of the film. Near the end of the scene in which the Diplomats go to Atlanta, Jim Jones is blurred out but can be identified by one of his slogans.

Release 
The film was released in 2006, nearly simultaneously with Cam'ron's Killa Season album. It was shown at a few theaters in New York City and is available on DVD.

Cast 
 Cam'ron as Flea
 Juelz Santana as Bandana
 Hell Rell as Hell 
 DJ Funkmaster Flex as Fred
 Damon Dash as himself
 Jim Jones as himself (Introduction Credits Only)
 J. R. Writer as himself
 DJ Megatron as Mega (credited as Mega McGriff)
 40 Cal as 40 Cal
 Big Joe as Fish
 Tony Alston as Drug Dealer / Homeboy #1
 Greyson Cruz as Spanish Connect
 Osas Ighodaro as Shinae (as Martha Ighodaro)
 Lou Martini Jr. as Lawyer
 Ryan Masterson as Bodega Kid
 Andy Pickens as Bells
 Antonio Meneses Saillant as Italian Henchman
 Michael K. Williams as Crackhead
 Ma$e as himself (archive footage)
 Cry Baby as Crybaby
 Yavus Aksu as Goat
 Sajad B as Purple Haze

See also 
 List of hood films

External links 
 

2006 direct-to-video films
2006 crime drama films
American independent films
American direct-to-video films
American crime drama films
2000s hip hop films
Hood films
2006 independent films
2006 films
2000s English-language films
2000s American films